Mohammad Abbasi (born 28 February 1958) is an Iranian politician who is the former minister of youth affairs and sports. He was Minister of Cooperatives in the first and second Cabinet of Mahmoud Ahmadinejad from 2005 to 2011.

Early life
He was born on 28 November 1958 in Gorgan, Golestan Province. He was president of Azad University of Ghaemshahr from 1996 to 2004.

Career
Abbasi was elected member of the Parliament of Iran from Gorgan constituency and was deputy head of budget center in the Parliament. After the resignation of Mohammad Ardakani as minister of cooperatives, President Mahmoud Ahmadinejad nominated Abbasi for the position to Parliament. He received 200 out of 285 votes and became minister 5 November 2006. He was re-appointed to the post in Second Cabinet of Ahmadinejad. On 20 June 2011, and after Ahmadinejad's candidate for ministry of youth affairs and sports was rejected by Parliament, he was appointed as acting minister. He was nominated for the full portfolio on 26 July 2011 and was confirmed by the Parliament on 3 August 2011.

References

1958 births
Living people
Islamic Azad University, Central Tehran Branch alumni
Government ministers of Iran
YEKTA Front politicians
People from Gorgan